Gregory "Greg" Corbitt (born 2 September 1971 in Perth, Western Australia) is a former Australian field hockey player who played as a striker for the Australian national team. He was a member of the team that won the silver medal at the 1992 Summer Olympics in Barcelona, Spain. Greg was known for his striking abilities. Notably, he was diagnosed with cancer from a urine sample submitted as part of drug screening for Australian National Team athletes and underwent successful surgery to remove a malignant tumor.

References

External links
 
 Profile on AOC website
 Profile on IOC website

1971 births
Living people
Australian male field hockey players
Male field hockey forwards
Olympic field hockey players of Australia
Olympic silver medalists for Australia
Field hockey players at the 1992 Summer Olympics
Olympic medalists in field hockey
Field hockey players from Perth, Western Australia
Medalists at the 1992 Summer Olympics
1990 Men's Hockey World Cup players
20th-century Australian people